Nahr al-Bared is a village in northwestern Syria, administratively part of the Hama Governorate, located northwest of Hama. It is situated in the al-Ghab plain in the al-Suqaylabiyah District. Nearby localities include Tell Salhab to the south, al-Asharinah to the east, Hawrat Ammorin and al-Suqaylabiyah to the north and al-Mazhal and Ayn al-Kurum to the northwest. According to the Syria Central Bureau of Statistics, Nahr al-Bared had a population of 4,016 in the 2004 census. Its inhabitants are predominantly Alawites.

Landscape
Although the village is considered modern, it still contains a number of ruins. The village is also situated near the Nahr al Bārid river and during the winter regularly receives snow.

Amenities
Nahr al-Bared has three hotels, called Sahara Hotel, Abo Allosh and Abo Maher. There are also three mosques in the village called al-Sheikh Abd al-Hadi Haidar, al-Sheikh Soliman Moaala and Ali Naser. The village also has a large restaurant which can be accessed by using a micro bus. Nahr al-Bared also contains a large petrol station.

References

External links

 WikiMapia
 Information on the provinces of Syria

Populated places in al-Suqaylabiyah District
Alawite communities in Syria